Qilan (Standard Chinese pronunciation ) is a very mild Wuyi oolong tea. It has an obvious sweet and nutty aroma.

See also
 Huang Mei Gui

References
 Babelcarp on Qi Lan

Oolong tea
Chinese teas
Chinese tea grown in Fujian
Wuyi tea
Cultivars of tea grown in China